Triplex is a French film directed by Georges Lautner, and released in 1991.

Crew
Director: Georges Lautner
Writer: Didier Van Cauwelaert
Music: Raymond Alessandrini
Editor: Georges Klotz

Cast
 Patrick Chesnais: Nicolas Montgerbier
 Cécile Pallas: Nathalie Challes
 François-Eric Gendron: Frank
 Jacques François: Mr Challes
 Jacques Jouanneau: father of Frank
 Sophie Carle: Brigitte
 Gilles Veber: Jacky
 Laurent Gamelon: Mario
 Julien Courbey

References

External links
 

1991 films
1991 comedy films
Films directed by Georges Lautner
1990s French-language films
French comedy films
1990s French films